Ciprian Ion Tănasă (born 2 February 1981 in Fălticeni, Suceava) is a Romanian footballer who plays for Liga IV side Vedița Colonești.

External links
 
 

1981 births
Living people
People from Fălticeni
Romanian footballers
Romania under-21 international footballers
Liga I players
Liga II players
Ukrainian Premier League players
Cypriot First Division players
Moldovan Super Liga players
FC Argeș Pitești players
SCM Râmnicu Vâlcea players
AFC Unirea Slobozia players
FC U Craiova 1948 players
FC Politehnica Iași (1945) players
FC Metalurh Donetsk players
CS Mioveni players
Alki Larnaca FC players
FC Sheriff Tiraspol players
Romanian expatriate footballers
Romanian expatriate sportspeople in Ukraine
Expatriate footballers in Ukraine
Romanian expatriate sportspeople in Cyprus
Expatriate footballers in Cyprus
Romanian expatriate sportspeople in Moldova
Expatriate footballers in Moldova
Association football forwards